The Benchwarmers is a 2006 American sports-comedy film produced by Revolution Studios and Happy Madison Productions, distributed by Columbia Pictures, directed by Dennis Dugan, written by Allen Covert and Nick Swardson, and starring Rob Schneider, David Spade and Jon Heder with Jon Lovitz, Craig Kilborn, Molly Sims and Tim Meadows in supporting roles. It tells the story of three nerds and a billionaire forming the titular baseball team to take on the little league baseball teams.

A direct-to-video sequel titled Benchwarmers 2: Breaking Balls was released in January 2019.

Plot
Gus Matthews, Richie Goodman, and Clark Reedy are adult "nerds" who spent their childhoods longing to play baseball, but never got the chance.

When a nerdy, chubby, unathletic boy named Nelson Carmichael and his friends are bullied and kicked off a baseball diamond by a local little league team, Gus and Clark chase the bullies away. When Gus and Clark go with Richie to the field, the bullies return and demand that they leave. Gus challenges the bullies to play them for the field. They win the game due to Gus' surprising aptitude. A man named Brad, one of Clark and Richie's childhood bullies, challenges them to another game, but the three friends win again.

After an encounter with Richie and Clark's childhood bully Jerry, they and Gus are approached by Nelson's billionaire father Mel who tells the trio about his plan to hold a round-robin with all the little league teams in the state, plus their team. The winners will be given access to a new multimillion-dollar baseball park. The three name themselves the Benchwarmers and join the tournament. Mel and his robot Number 7 cover up Gus' involvement with his wife Liz.

Jerry and the coaches of the little league teams start meeting to think of plans to defeat the Benchwarmers. The Benchwarmers win every single game, with Clark and Richie's abilities gradually improving, Richie's brother Howie facing his fears, and the team becomes popular among many nerds, children with poor athletic abilities, and the general public.

At the semi-final game, the competing team's coach Wayne is down to the Benchwarmers by several runs. Desperate, he seeks the help of a 30-year-old Dominican professional baseball player named Carlos to join his team to get back into the game. Despite Carlos clearly being an adult and having a falsified birth certificate, Wayne bribes the home plate umpire to successfully get Carlos on his team. The impact is immediate as Carlos's superb pitching and hitting get Wayne's team back in the game. However, The Benchwarmers quickly realize that Carlos has a major drinking problem, and they give him as much alcohol as possible throughout the rest of the game. After a bunt from Gus, the Benchwarmers run into their first instance of loading the bases, leading to Howie's first at-bat due to being the only Benchwarmer on-deck. Howie is hit by a pitch due to Carlos being intoxicated, which drives in the game-winning run for the Benchwarmers.

After multiple unsuccessful attempts to derail the trio, the Benchwarmers' adversaries finally find a weakness that they can exploit. Brad finds evidence that Gus was a bully himself as a child from his poker buddy Steven, known for using name calling over physical force and had bullied one boy named Marcus so intensely that he had to be sent to a mental institution. Seizing this opportunity, Jerry and Steven expose Gus' secret to the public, shaming Gus into resigning from the team. After a talk with Liz, Gus sincerely apologizes to Marcus just before the final game.

Mel enlists Ultimate Home Remodel to build his stadium. On the day of the big game against Jerry's baseball team, Marcus forgives Gus in front of everyone at the beginning of the final game. Gus re-joins the team, announcing that Marcus is the Benchwarmers' new third-base coach.

In the final game, Gus, Clark, and Richie let a team consisting of Nelson and other non-athletic children play, to give them a chance to play. In the final inning, the Benchwarmers are losing, but Jerry's team sees that the Benchwarmers are having fun playing the game anyway. Seeing how abusive and uncaring Jerry is and realizing the true spirit of the game, they decide to let Nelson score a run, saying that Jerry is "the loser". The Benchwarmers storm the field, celebrating the fact that they were not shut out.

The entire Benchwarmers team, along with the kids from Jerry's team, Marcus, and even Carlos and Wayne, celebrate at Pizza Hut. Richie and Clark get girlfriends, Howie informs Wayne that he's not a big fan of the Moon, and Gus announces that he is going to become a father.

Cast
 Rob Schneider as Gus Matthews, a nerd and reformed childhood bully who works as a groundskeeper.
 David Spade as Richie Goodman, a nerd and video rental store worker at Video Stop.
 Jon Heder as Clark Reedy, a nerd and paperboy.
 Jon Lovitz as Mel Carmichael, a billionaire who funds the Benchwarmers.
 Craig Kilborn as Jerry McDowell, a mean-spirited little league coach that picked on Richie and Clark.
 Molly Sims as Liz Matthews, the wife of Gus.
 Tim Meadows as Wayne, a little league coach who is one of Jerry's friends.
 Nick Swardson as Howie Goodman, Richie's agoraphobic and heliophobic brother.
 Erinn Bartlett as Sarah, the Pizza and Salad Girl who Richie falls for.
 Amaury Nolasco as Carlos, a Dominican man whom Wayne recruits to his little league team.
 Bill Romanowski as Karl, a little league coach who is one of Jerry's friends.
 Reggie Jackson as himself
 Sean Salisbury as Brad, a little league coach who picks on Richie and Clark.
 Patrick Schwarzenegger as Jock Kid Game #3
 Terry Crews as Steven, a poker friend of Brad who wears a wig.
 Dan Patrick as O'Malley
 Joe Gnoffo as Marcus Ellwood, a man with dwarfism who Gus used to pick on when they were boys.
 Jillian Henry as Gretchen Peterson, one of the child commentators for the Benchwarmers' baseball games.
 Garrett Julian as Mitchell, one of the child commentators for the Benchwarmers' baseball games.
 Alex Warrick as Sammy Sprinkler, a spit-talking boy who helps out the Benchwarmers.

Cameos:
 Danny McCarthy as Troy
 Matt Weinberg as Kyle
 John Farley as Swimmer Boy
 Jackie Sandler as a female Video Stop customer who gives Richie a negative comment about the video she rented
 Jared Sandler as an autograph Kid
 Rachel Hunter as a hot mother who becomes Clark Reedy's first kiss
 Rob Moore as Poker Guy #3
 Blake Clark as an Umpire who Wayne bribes to allow Carlos play for his team.
 Dennis Dugan as Coach Bellows
 Jonathan Loughran as Brad's assistant coach
 Mary Jo Catlett as Mrs. Ellwood, the mother of Marcus.
 Lochlyn Munro as Ultimate Home Remodel Host
 Matt Willig as Jock Guy
 Cleo King as Lady Customer
 Bob Sexton as Karl's assistant coach
 Tom Silardi as Candia Coach
 Michael Moore as Candia Assistant Coach
 J.J. Darwish as Goth Kid
 Ellie Schneider as Carol, the girlfriend of a goth kid.
 Gabriel Pimental as Little Man
 Jon Moscot (uncredited)

Voices
 Doug Jones as Number 7, Mel's robot servant.
 James Earl Jones as a Darth Vader Gatekeeper System that is positioned outside of Mel's house.
 William Daniels as KITT (uncredited)

Production
The Benchwarmers was shot at various locations in California, mostly in Agoura Hills, in Chumash Park and at a Pizza Hut. Other locations were Chino Hills; Chino; Culver City; Glendale; Watson Drug Store Chapman Avenue, Orange; Simi Valley; Westwood, Los Angeles and on Mulholland Hwy, Malibu (Mel's house).

Reception
On Rotten Tomatoes The Benchwarmers scored 13% based on 71 reviews, with the site's consensus reading, "A gross-out comedy that is more sophomoric than funny, The Benchwarmers goes down swinging." On Metacritic, the film has a score of 25 out of 100 based on 17 critics, indicating "generally unfavorable reviews". Audiences polled by CinemaScore gave the film an average grade of "B" on an A+ to F scale.

Manohla Dargis of The New York Times wrote: "The Benchwarmers is the sort of trash that Hollywood does really well" and noted it was only in theaters to raise awareness for the home-rental market. Dargis concludes by quoting Schneider, who called it "a master's thesis on the form of a quintessential Adam Sandler comedy."
	
Owen Gleiberman of Entertainment Weekly gave it a positive review: "This morphing of "The Bad News Bears" and a "Three Stooges" episode parades its dumbness with such zip that it almost passes for clever."

Box office
The film was a box office success. In its opening weekend, it grossed $19.6 million, ranking second at the North American box office behind Ice Age: The Meltdown. The film finished with $59,843,754 domestically and $5,113,537 in other markets, totaling $64,957,291 worldwide. The film held the record for the highest opening weekend gross for a baseball genre film, until 2013 when it was surpassed by the Jackie Robinson film "42".

Award nominations
2006 Teen Choice Awards:
 Choice Movie - Comedy
 Choice Movie Actor – Comedy (Jon Heder)
 Choice Movie Rumble (Jon Heder vs. Karl's Auto Body)
 Choice Movie Chemistry (Rob Schneider, David Spade and Jon Heder)

2006 Stinkers Bad Movie Awards:
 Worst On-Screen Hairstyle (David Spade)

2007 Razzie Awards:
 Worst Actor (Rob Schneider)

2010 Razzie Awards:
 Worst Actor of the Decade (Rob Schneider)

Home media
The film was released on DVD, Blu-ray and UMD on July 25, 2006.

Sequel
In July 2018, Revolution Studios and Universal 1440 Entertainment announced a direct-to-DVD sequel titled Benchwarmers 2: Breaking Balls. The film was released on January 29, 2019, with Jon Lovitz reprising his role as Mel Carmichael. The rest of the cast consists of Chris Klein, Chelsey Reist, Lochlyn Munro, and Garfield Wilson.

References

External links

 
 
 David Spade interview for The Benchwarmers

2006 films
2006 comedy films
2000s buddy comedy films
2000s sports comedy films
American sports comedy films
2000s English-language films
American baseball films
American buddy comedy films
Columbia Pictures films
Films produced by Adam Sandler
Films produced by Jack Giarraputo
Films directed by Dennis Dugan
Films with screenplays by Allen Covert
Films with screenplays by Nick Swardson
Happy Madison Productions films
Revolution Studios films
2000s American films